Kentwood is a city in Kent County in the U.S. state of Michigan. The population was 54,304 as of the 2020 census. The city is bordered on the northwest by Grand Rapids and is the third most-populated municipality in the Grand Rapids metropolitan area.

History
The city was incorporated in 1967 from what remained of Paris Township to prevent further annexation of land from the adjacent cities of Grand Rapids and Wyoming. The city was named after Kent County, which was named after jurist James Kent.

The city's first mayor was Peter M. Lamberts, who served in that post until 1979. Subsequent mayors have included Marvin Hoeflinger (1979–1981), Gerald DeRuiter (1981–1992), Bill Hardiman (1992–2002), Richard Root (2002–2012), Richard Clanton (2012–2013), and Stephen Kepley (2013–present).

Kentwood Mine
The Kentwood Mine is an underground gypsum mine in Kentwood, at  Opened in 1971 and closed in 2000, it was operated by Georgia-Pacific.

Geography
The city is bordered by Wyoming to the west, Grand Rapids and Grand Rapids Township to the north, Cascade Township to the east, and Gaines Township to the south.

Major highways
  passes through the northeast corner of the city.
  runs along 28th Street.
  runs along East Beltline Avenue and Broadmoor Avenue to the south.

Trails
Kentwood has two trails:

 Paul Henry Rail Trail from 44th Street and Kalamazoo to 60th Street and Wing Avenue
 East-West Trail from Division Avenue to Breton Avenue

Climate
The Köppen Climate Classification subtype for this climate is "Dfb" (Warm Summer Continental Climate).

Demographics

2010 census
As of the census of 2010, there were 48,707 people, 19,741 households, and 12,345 families residing in the city. The racial makeup of the city was 70.1% White, 15.4% African American, 0.4% Native American, 6.6% Asian, 0.1% Pacific Islander, 3.5% from other races, and 3.9% from two or more races. Hispanic or Latino people of any race were 8.5% of the population.

There were 19,741 households, of which 32.9% had children under the age of 18 living with them, 45.3% were married couples living together, 13.1% had a female householder with no husband present, 4.1% had a male householder with no wife present, and 37.5% were non-families. 30.9% of all households were made up of individuals, and 10.3% had someone living alone who was 65 years of age or older. The average household size was 2.45 and the average family size was 3.10.

The median age in the city was 34.3 years. 25.4% of residents were under the age of 18; 9.8% were between the ages of 18 and 24; 28.8% were from 25 to 44; 24.3% were from 45 to 64; and 11.5% were 65 years of age or older. The gender makeup of the city was 48.0% male and 52.0% female.

As of 2000 the median income for a household in the city was $48,335, and the median income for a family was $60,391. The per capita income for the city was $24,261. About 9.8% of families and 12.2% of the population were below the poverty line, including 16.8% of those under age 18 and 7.6% of those age 65 or over.

2000 census
As of the 2000 census, there were 45,255 people, 18,477 households, and 11,529 families residing in the city. The population density was 830.5/km (2,150.6/mi²). There were 19,507 housing units at an average density of 358.0/km (927.0/mi²). The racial makeup of the city was 80.87% White, 9.09% African American, 0.46% Native American, 5.63% Asian, 0.04% Pacific Islander, 1.42% from other races, and 2.48% from two or more races. Hispanic or Latino of any race were 3.88% of the population.

There were 18,477 households, out of which 33.3% had children under the age of 18 living with them, 48.3% were married couples living together, 10.8% had a female householder with no husband present, and 37.6% were non-families. 30.9% of all households were made up of individuals, and 8.2% had someone living alone who was 65 years of age or older. The average household size was 2.43 and the average family size was 3.10.

In the city the population was spread out, with 26.6% under the age of 18, 10.4% from 18 to 24, 33.7% from 25 to 44, 19.5% from 45 to 64, and 9.8% who were 65 years of age or older. The median age was 32 years. For every 100 females there were 93.2 males. For every 100 females age 18 and over, there were 89.4 males.

The median income for a household in the city was $45,812, and the median income for a family was $55,615. Males had a median income of $40,544 versus $27,632 for females. The per capita income for the city was $22,463. About 5.0% of families and 6.3% of the population were below the poverty line, including 8.4% of those under age 18 and 6.0% of those age 65 or over.

Government
Kentwood has a mayor, who also serves as the city manager, and a legislature consisting of a city commission. The current mayor is Stephen Kepley. The mayor pro tempore is selected by the city commission; Ward 1 Commissioner Robert Coughlin currently serves in this role. The mayor serves as a voting member of the city commission and presides over commission meetings. However, he does not have the power to veto a resolution or ordinance.

Voters in Kentwood elect a mayor, city clerk, and city treasurer to four-year terms, and elect six city commissioners to four-year, staggered terms. Every two years, voters in each of the city's two wards elect one commissioner, while another city commissioner is elected by the city at-large.

Education

Library
Kentwood is located within the Kent District Library district. The Kentwood Branch Library opened in 2010 on Breton Avenue, next to Kentwood City Hall. Mayor Stephen Kepley, who at the time was the City Engineer, was the project manager for the new library. The library was named the Richard L. Root Library after Kentwood's fifth mayor, who led the city commission and residents in approving a dedicated millage for its construction.

The library is located next to an old landfill that received federal funds to make it one of the many superfund sites in the United States. The Environmental Protection Agency and Kent County installed a methane flare to burn excess methane from the decaying landfill in 2015. Previously, the Kentwood Library had been located on Kalamazoo Avenue south of 44th Street, on property donated by the Bowen/Stauffer family.

Public schools
The main public school district in Kentwood is the Kentwood Public Schools, consisting of one high school, one freshman campus, three middle schools, ten active elementary schools, and one closed elementary school which has become home to the early childhood programs:

 East Kentwood High School
 Crossroads Alternative High School
 East Kentwood Freshman Campus
 Crestwood Middle School
 Pinewood Middle School
 Valleywood Middle School
 Bowen Elementary School
 Brookwood Elementary School
 Challenger Elementary School
 Discovery Elementary School
 Endeavor Elementary School
 Explorer Elementary School
 Glenwood Elementary School
 Meadowlawn Elementary School
 Southwood Elementary School
 Townline Elementary School
 Hamilton Early Childhood Center

Also included within Kentwood's city limits are the Forest Hills Public Schools and Kelloggsville Public Schools.

Notable people
Kristen Kish, season 10 winner of Top Chef
Mike Knuble, former NHL hockey player
Loy Vaught, former NBA basketball player
Joe Warren, two-time Bellator world champion

References

External links

City of Kentwood official website

Cities in Kent County, Michigan
Grand Rapids metropolitan area
Underground mines in the United States
Superfund sites in Michigan
1967 establishments in Michigan
Populated places established in 1967